The 2019 COSAFA Women's Championship is the seventh edition of the COSAFA Women's Championship, a women's international football tournament for national teams organised by COSAFA, teams from Southern Africa. It takes place from 31 July to 11 August in the Nelson Mandela Bay Metropolitan Municipality, South Africa.

Participants
Twelve of the fourteen COSAFA member took take part in the competition with Comoros entering the competition for the first time. Also rejoining the competition would be Eswatini who didn't compete in last year's tournament. The draw was held on 3 July.

Venues

Group stage
The group stage is composed of three groups of four teams each. Group winners and the best runner-up amongst all groups advance to the semi-finals.
 All times are South African Standard Time (UTC+2).

Group A

Group B

Group C

Knockout stage

Semi-finals

Bronze medal match

Final

Statistics

Goalscorers

Awards

References

External links
Official website

2019
2019 in African football
2019–20 in South African soccer
2019 in South African women's sport
2019 in women's association football
International association football competitions hosted by South Africa
July 2019 sports events in Africa
August 2019 sports events in Africa